Wantirna is a suburb in Melbourne, Victoria, Australia, 24 km east of Melbourne's Central Business District, located within the City of Knox local government area. Wantirna recorded a population of 14,237 at the 2021 census.

Its name is derived from the local aboriginal people’s expression  for, "a gurgling stream".

The Knox Private Hospital, Westfield Knox shopping centre, and Kieran are located in Wantirna.

The EastLink tollway runs through Wantirna with interchanges at Boronia Road and Burwood Highway.

Wantirna was first settled by Australians of European descent in 1840 when Mrs. Madeline Scott established the "Bushy Park" cattle run on the banks of the Dandenong Creek. During the 1870s other pioneers opened up the area to settlement. In 1912 the need for a school to serve the local area soon became apparent in this small but fast-growing area; the Finger family donated two acres of land on the southern side of Mountain Hwy (then known as Wantirna-Sassafras Rd) and a timber schoolhouse was opened. The Finger and Fankhauser families were prime movers in the erection of the Methodist Church opened opposite the school in May 1914, and a parish hall was built on Burwood Highway in 1924. Wantirna Post Office opened on 1 November 1913, closed in 1977, and reopened in 1983. The Wantirna Reserve was provided by the council in 1925 and a tennis court was built there shortly afterwards. In December 1939, after the outbreak of World War II, West Prussia Road was renamed Wantirna Road.

Locations in Wantirna, especially Westfield Knox, are occasionally used to shoot the soap opera Neighbours. Koomba Park is a large native bushland park spanning the area between Dandenong Creek and the Eastlink Tollway. It is run by Parks Victoria and was opened in 1982. The Victorian Jazz Archive is located in Koomba Park.

Schools

Schools in Wantirna include Wantirna Primary School, Wantirna College, Regency Park Primary School, Templeton Primary School and St Luke's Primary School.

Churches
 Hills Bible Church  
 Knox Presbyterian Church
 The Church of Jesus Christ of Latter-day Saints, Stake Centre and the Melbourne Australia Temple (churchofjesuschrist.org)

References

Suburbs of Melbourne
Suburbs of the City of Knox